The 1936 Spring Hill Badgers football team was an American football team that represented Spring Hill College as a member of the Dixie Conference during the 1936 college football season. In their eighth year under head coach William T. Daly, the team compiled a 3–6 record.

Schedule

References

Spring Hill
Spring Hill Badgers football seasons
Spring Hill Badgers football